Franziskus is a name which is derivative of the Latin given name Franciscus.

As a given name
 Franziskus von Paula Graf von Schönborn
 Franziskus von Bettinger
 Franziskus von Sales Bauer
 Franziskus Hennemann

As a surname
 Daniel Franziskus